The 2021 Big Ten men's basketball tournament was a postseason men's basketball tournament for the Big Ten Conference of the 2020–21 NCAA Division I men's basketball season which took place March 10–14, 2021. The tournament was originally to be held at the United Center in Chicago, Illinois. However, on February 9, the tournament was moved to Lucas Oil Stadium in Indianapolis, Indiana to better deal with testing concerns raised by the ongoing COVID-19 pandemic. 

Illinois defeated Ohio State 91–88 in overtime in the championship game to win the tournament. As a result, they received the conference's automatic bid to the NCAA tournament.

Seeds
All 14 Big Ten schools participated in the tournament. Teams were seeded by conference record, with a tiebreaker system used to seed teams with identical conference records. The top 10 teams received a first round bye and the top four teams received a double bye. Tiebreaking procedures remained unchanged from the 2020 tournament.

Schedule

*Game times in Eastern Time. #Rankings denote tournament seeding.

Bracket

* denotes overtime period

Game summaries

First round

Second round

Quarterfinals

Semifinals

Championship

All-Tournament Team
 Ayo Dosunmu, Illinois – Big Ten tournament Most Outstanding Player
 Kofi Cockburn, Illinois
 Luka Garza, Iowa
 EJ Liddell, Ohio State
 Duane Washington Jr., Ohio State

References

Tournament
Big Ten men's basketball tournament
Basketball competitions in Indianapolis
College sports tournaments in Indiana
Big Ten Conference men's basketball tournament
Big Ten Conference men's basketball tournament
2020s in Indianapolis